Carabus viridifossulatus is a species of black-coloured beetle from family Carabidae, found in Gansu, Hubei, and Sichuan provinces of China.

References

Beetles described in 1887
viridifossulatus
Beetles of Asia
Endemic fauna of China